São Vicente di Longe is the eighth album by Cesária Évora.  The album charted at number 32 on the Swiss charts for 11 weeks, the longest of any Évora's record.

Track listing

Charts

Singles

Certifications and sales

References

External links

2001 albums
Cesária Évora albums